Halfpenny Dancer is an album by English rock band the Quireboys, released in 2009.

The album consists of their songs, captured in acoustic form. Two different editions of Halfpenny Dancer were released: the original 13 song version, limited to 1000 copies, and a deluxe package with a new design and two bonus songs: "Halfpenny Dancer" and "Have A Drink With Me". The album was produced by Chris Corney.

Track listing
 "There She Goes Again" (Bailey/Gray)
 "Devil of a Man" (Bailey/Gray)
 "Love to Love" (Schenker, Mogg) UFO cover
 "Mona Lisa Smiled" (Griffin/Gray)
 "Halfpenny Dancer" (Gray/Griffin)
 "I Can't Stop Loving You" (Billy Nicholls)
 "Roses & Rings" (Gray/Bailey)
 "Baby It's You" (Miller)
 "Hello" (Griffin/Gray)
 "Pretty Girls" (Gray/Bailey)
 "He'll Have to Go" (Joe Allison, Audrey Allison)
 "Long Time Comin'" (Gray/Bailey)
 "Have a Drink with Me" (Gray/Guerin)
 "Hates to Please" (Bailey/Gray)
 "King of New York" (Bailey/Gray/Vallance)

Personnel
Spike – vocals
Guy Griffin – guitars, backing vocals
Keith Weir – piano, backing vocals
Paul Guerin – guitars
Phil Martini – drums, percussion
Damon Williams – bass

Additional musicians
Rob Bond – pedal steel
Moritz Behm – fiddle
Lee Spence – mandolin, dobro
Rachel Cullum – violin on "Hello"
Chris Corney – bass, banjo, dobro

References

2009 albums
The Quireboys albums